I Come with the Rain is a 2009 neo-noir thriller written and directed by Vietnamese-born French director Tran Anh Hung, starring American actor Josh Hartnett.

After making three movies about Vietnam, Tran Anh Hung intended to make a baroque action film, a passionate thriller, both intense and poetic, haunted by three characters from the mythology of film and the Western world: the serial killer, the private investigator, and the Christ figure.

The action takes place in Los Angeles, Mindanao and Hong Kong and brings together American and Asian actors.

The film score is written by the Argentine Academy Award Winner Gustavo Santaolalla and the English alternative rock band Radiohead.  The filmmaker also makes heavy use of post-rock music, including songs by Explosions in the Sky, Godspeed You! Black Emperor, and A Silver Mt. Zion.

The film premiered in Tokyo at Toho Cinemas Roppongi Hills on May 27, 2009.

Synopsis

Two years after killing Hasford, a serial killer, in the line of duty, Kline now works as a private detective, but he is still haunted by the ghosts of his past. A powerful pharmaceutical conglomerate boss hires Kline to find his only son Shitao who has mysteriously disappeared in the Philippines where he had been helping in an orphanage.

Kline follows the trail left by the ethereal Shitao to the jungles of Mindanao, and then to the urban jungle of Hong Kong, where he enlists the help of Meng Zi, an old police officer friend. The search leads Kline to cross paths with local organized crime syndicate boss Su Dongpo, who is making trouble for the underworld, triggered by an overriding passion for his  drug-addicted girlfriend Lili.

Caught in the crossfire between the Hong Kong police and Su Dongpo's mafia drug ring which is also hunting for Shitao, Kline finds himself alone, in this unknown city, when Meng Zi is victim of an assassination attempt and is hospitalised.

Leaving behind his 5-star hotel for a shabby murder scene apartment in order to get inside the mind of Shitao, Kline gradually loses himself in the terrifying memories of Hasford, whose speciality was dissecting his victims' limbs while they were still alive, then reassembling them into installation sculptures.

After a few weeks immersed in his haunted memories, torn between good and evil, Kline is about to leave Hong Kong when he finds Shitao, who has become a mysterious vagrant with healing powers.

Cast

Main cast

Josh Hartnett as Kline
Elias Koteas as Hasford
Lee Byung-hun as Su Dongpo
Takuya Kimura as Shitao
Shawn Yue as Meng Zi
Trần Nữ Yên Khê as Lili

Supporting cast

Eusebio Poncela as Vargas
Sam Lee as The Monk Artist
Carl Ng as The Dead Sack Man
William Chow Tze Ho as Mi Fu
Bo-yuan Chan as Dai Xi
Russ Kingston as Felix Sportis
Jo Kuk as The 9mm Lover
David Tang as Wang Wei
Thea Aquino as The Erotic Dancer
Alvaro Longoria as The Psychiatrist
Benito Sagredo as The Male Nurse

Festival screenings

6th Fresh Film Fest

Section: Contemporary World Cinema
Location: Karlovy Vary, Czech Republic  
Screening dates: August 13, 2009 - August 15, 2009

14th Busan International Film Festival

Section: Gala Presentation
Location: Busan, South Korea  
Screening dates: October 9, 2009 - October 13, 2009 - October 15, 2009

15th Lund International Fantastic Film Festival

Section: International Competition (nominated: The Siren Best Film)
Location: Lund, Sweden
Screening date: September 19, 2009

3rd Empire Open Cinema

Section: Selection
Location: Moscow, Russia
Screening dates: September 2, 2010

References

External links
 archive

I Come with the Rain at Box Office Mojo
International Sales (TF1 International)

2009 films
2000s crime drama films
2009 independent films
2009 psychological thriller films
French neo-noir films
English-language French films
French independent films
Films set in Hong Kong
Films set in Los Angeles
Films set in California
Films set in the Philippines
Films directed by Tran Anh Hung
Films shot in the Philippines
Films scored by Gustavo Santaolalla
2009 drama films
2000s English-language films
2000s French films